The Muzaffarid dynasty, sometimes referred as Ahmedabad dynasty, were Sultans of Gujarat in western India from 1391 to 1583. The founder of the dynasty was Zafar Khan  (later Muzaffar Shah I) who was governor of Gujarat under the suzerainty of the Tughlaq dynasty of the Delhi Sultanate. 

Zafar Khan's father Sadharan, has been variously described a Rajput sect of Tonk, Rajputana, a Tank Rajput from Thanesar in modern-day Haryana, or a Tānk Khatri from southern Punjab. Other historians such as Dr. V.K Agnihotri and Saiyid Athar Abbas Rizvi even wrote that his father, Sadhāran, was a Jat convert to Islam. He adopted the name Wajih-ul-Mulk. Wajih-ul-Mulk and his brother were influential Chaudharis who were agriculturists by profession but could also muster thousands of fighting men on their call. His Hindu forebearers claimed descend from Rāmachandra, who the Hindus worshipped as God. Such genealogies were fabricated to glorify royalty and were generally not accepted. When the Sultanate was weakened by the sacking of Delhi by Timur in 1398, and Zafar Khan took the opportunity to establish himself as sultan of an independent Gujarat. His son, Ahmed Shah I established the capital at Ahmedabad. The dynasty ruled for almost 200 years, until the conquest of Gujarat by the Mughal Empire in 1572. The sultanate reached its peak of expansion under Mahmud Begada, reaching east into Malwa and west to the Gulf of Kutch.

Sultans of Gujarat Sultanate

See also
List of Sunni Muslim dynasties

Notes

Dynasties of India
Gujarat Sultanate
Indian former Hindus
1583 disestablishments
States and territories established in 1391
Sunni dynasties